El Telégrafo is a Spanish-language daily newspaper in Guayaquil, Ecuador founded in 1884. It is the oldest newspaper in Ecuador.

References

External links
 

Newspapers published in Ecuador
Publications established in 1884
Telégrafo (Ecuador)